Devon Hyde (born 26 December 1967) is a Belizean athlete. He competed in the men's triple jump at the 1988 Summer Olympics.

References

1967 births
Living people
Athletes (track and field) at the 1987 Pan American Games
Athletes (track and field) at the 1988 Summer Olympics
Belizean male triple jumpers
Olympic athletes of Belize
Pan American Games competitors for Belize
World Athletics Championships athletes for Belize
Place of birth missing (living people)